In linguistics, a light verb is a verb that has little semantic content of its own and forms a predicate with some additional expression, which is usually a noun. Common verbs in English that can function as light verbs are do, give, have, make, get, and take. Other names for light verb include delexical verb, vector verb, explicator verb, thin verb, empty verb and semantically weak verb. While light verbs are similar to auxiliary verbs regarding their contribution of meaning to the clauses in which they appear, light verbs fail the diagnostics that identify auxiliary verbs and are therefore distinct from auxiliaries.

Light verb constructions challenge theories of compositionality because the words that form such constructions do not together qualify as constituents although the word combinations qualify as catenae.

Examples

English 
Most light verb constructions in English include a noun and are sometimes called stretched verbs. Some light verb constructions also include a preposition, e.g.

They did the review of my paper first.
Sam did the cleaning yesterday.

Who got such intense criticism?
Susan is getting much support from her family.

I am going to have a nice nap.
She had a smoke.
We had a slow, boring conversation.

Are you giving a presentation at the conference?
They gave the kids a hard time.
Who will give you a hug?

Who made such a severe mistake?
I made the first request.

Sam has taken a shower.
Why is Larry taking a nap?
We should take a break soon.
Have you taken advantage of that opportunity.
I haven't taken that into consideration.

The light verbs are underlined, and the words in bold together constitute the light verb constructions. Each of these constructions is the (primary part of the) main predicate of the sentence. Note that the determiner a is usually NOT part of the light verb construction. We know that it is not part of the light verb construction because it is variable, e.g. I took a long/the first/two/the best nap. The light verb contributes little content to its sentence; the main meaning resides with the noun in bold.

Hindi-Urdu 
Light verb constructions in Hindi–Urdu (Hindustani) are highly productive. Light verbs in Hindi–Urdu can combine with another verb, an adjective, adverb or even a borrowed English verb or noun. The light verb loses its own independent meaning and instead "lends a certain shade of meaning" to the main or stem verb, which "comprises the lexical core of the compound". While any verb can act as a main verb, there is a limited set of productive light verbs. Some commonly used light verbs are shown in the table belowː

Alternative constructions with full verbs
Many light verb constructions are closely similar in meaning to a corresponding full verb, e.g.

a. Sam did a revision of his paper. – Light verb construction
b. Sam revised his paper. -Full verb

a. Larry wants to have a smoke. – Light verb construction
b. Larry wants to smoke. – Full verb

a. Jim made an important claim that.... – Light verb construction
b. Jim claimed that... – Full verb
a. Mary is taking a nap. – Light verb construction
b. Mary is napping. – Full verb

Alternative formulations such as these lead to the insight that light verb constructions are predicates just like the corresponding full verb alternatives. There can be, however, nuanced differences in meaning across these alternative formulations. The light verb constructions produce possibilities for modification that are less available with the corresponding full verb alternatives.

Contrasted with auxiliary verbs and full verbs
Many verbs that serve as light verbs can also serve as auxiliary verbs and/or full verbs depending on the context in which they appear. Light verbs are similar to auxiliary verbs insofar as they contribute mainly functional content (as opposed to semantic content) to the clauses in which they appear. Light verbs, however, are not auxiliary verbs, nor are they full verbs. Light verbs differ from auxiliary verbs in English insofar as they do not pass the syntactic tests that identify auxiliary verbs. The following examples illustrate that light verbs fail the inversion and negation diagnostics that identify auxiliary verbs:

a. He did call Susan yesterday.
b. Did he call Susan yesterday? – The auxiliary did inverts with the subject.
c. He did not call Susan yesterday. – The auxiliary did can take not as a postdependent.

a. He did the review of my paper yesterday.
b. *Did he the review of my paper yesterday? – The light verb did cannot invert with the subject.
c. *He did not the review of my paper yesterday. – The light verb did cannot take not as a postdependent.

a. He has opened the window.
b. Has he opened the window? – The auxiliary has inverts with the subject.
c. He has not opened the window. – The auxiliary has takes not as a postdependent.

a. She had a smoke.
b. *Had she a smoke? – The light verb had cannot invert with the subject.
c. *She had not a smoke. – The light verb had cannot take not as a postdependent.

Light verbs differ from full verbs in that light verbs lack the semantic content that full verbs have. Full verbs are the core of a predicate, whereas light verbs form a predicate with another expression (often a noun) with full semantic content. This distinction is more difficult to illustrate, but it can be seen in the following examples involving reflexive pronouns:

a. Jim1 took a picture of himself1. – The light verb took requires the reflexive pronoun to appear.
b. *Jim1 took a picture of him1. – The light verb took prohibits the simple pronoun from appearing.

a. Jim1 took a picture of himself1 to school. – The full verb took allows the reflexive pronoun to appear.
b. Jim1 took a picture of him1 to school. – The full verb took allows the simple pronoun to appear.

a. Sally1 gave a description of herself1. – The light verb gave requires the reflexive pronoun to appear.
b. *Sally1 gave a description of her1. – The light verb gave prohibits the simple pronoun from appearing.

a. Sally1 gave me a description of herself1. – The full verb gave allows the reflexive pronoun to appear
b. Sally1 gave me a description of her1. – The full verb gave allows the simple pronoun to appear.

The indices indicate coreference, i.e. the two coindexed words denote the same person. The reflexive pronoun must appear with the light verb, whereas the full verb allows the simple pronoun to appear as well. This distinction has to do with the extent of the predicate. The main predicate reaches down into the noun phrase when the light verb appears, whereas it excludes the noun phrase when the full verb is present.

Compositionality in terms of catenae
Light-verb constructions present the same difficulty associated with idiosyncratic expressions of every sort: the meaning is not compositional in a straightforward way. This fact is evident in the examples above, inasmuch as the words that constitute a light-verb construction often do not qualify as a constituent in any sense. These constructions do, however, form catenae (= chains). This fact is illustrated with the following dependency grammar trees:

The words of each light-verb construction form a catena. In this regard, the words in green qualify as the main predicate of the clause each time. If an auxiliary verb is present (as in trees b and d), it is included in the main predicate because like the light verb, it contributes functional meaning only.

In other languages
Examples in other languages include the Yiddish geb in geb a helf (literally give a help, "help"); the French faire in faire semblant (lit. make seeming, "pretend"); the Hindi nikal paRA (lit. leave fall, "start to leave"); and the bǎ construction in Chinese. Light verbs are extremely common in modern Indo-Iranian languages, Japanese, Basque and other languages in which verb compounding is a primary mechanism for marking aspectual distinctions. Light verbs are also equivalent to inherent complement verbs in many Kwa languages, e.g. jo in jo foi "run" (Ga), tu in tu fo "advise" (Akan).

Australian languages 
A significant proportion of Australian Aboriginal languages have verbal systems involving light verbs. Many Australian inflecting-verb classes are closed classes and very few in membership. Thus, in order to express more intricate assertions, matrix verbs are combined with coverbal elements such as preverbs to form complex verbal predicates. In such instances, the matrix verb typically still bears all of the tense–aspect–mood inflection but contributes little to the sentence semantically (i.e. is more of a function word); as noted above, however, they are still distinct from traditional auxiliary verbs.

Bardi 
One such Australian language with prevalent uses of light verbs is Bardi, a Nyulnyulan language spoken in the north of Australia. Although its inflecting-verb class is comparatively large with respect to some other Australian languages (~230 members), a number of these appear often as light verbs. Comprising the most frequent of these light verbs are the verb roots -ju- 'do/say' and -ma- 'put.' An example of the latter in use is:

In a case such as the above, liyan 'heart' is the preverb containing most of the semantic content. Likewise with goo 'hit' in the following example:

Jingulu 
Typically, in languages with coverb+light-verb predicates, these words must be directly adjacent; however, in extremely rare cases in languages such as Jingulu, there can be intervening elements between the semantically-rich preverb and the inflected matrix verb. See the following example where the subject ngaya appears between the preverb ambaya  'speak' and the inflected main verb nu 'do.'

This rare but significant phenomenon provides evidence that, even in more heavily agglutinating languages like Jingulu wherein the main verb may not be morphologically independent from the preverb, these are in fact light verbs and not inflectional affixes.

Diachronic considerations
Light verbs are interesting to linguists from a variety of perspectives, including those of diachronic linguistics and computational linguistics. From the diachronic perspective, the light verb is said to have evolved from the "heavy" verb through semantic bleaching, a process in which the verb loses some or all of its original semantics. In this sense, the light verb is often viewed as part of a cline:

verb (heavy) → light verb → auxiliary verb → clitic → affix → conjugation

However, the light verb → auxiliary path is disputed, since a) light verbs can remain stable for very long periods (cf. Butt and Lahiri (2013), and b) since both light verbs and auxiliaries can exist in the same languages, descended from the same full lexical verb, but with different meanings.

In computational linguistics, a serious challenge is that of identifying light verb constructions, which require marking light verbs.

See also
 Phrasal verb
 Serial verb – compound of multiple "heavy" verbs
 Stretched verb

Notes

References

 Adger, D. 2003. Core syntax: A minimalist approach. Oxford, UK: Oxford University Press.
 Butt, M. 2003. The Light Verb Jungle. In Harvard Working Papers in Linguistics, ed. G. Aygen, C. Bowern, and C. Quinn. 1–49. Volume 9, Papers from the GSAS/Dudley House workshop on light verbs.
 Collins Cobuild English Grammar 1995. London: HarperCollins Publishers. 
 Grimshaw, J. and A. Mester. 1988. Light verbs and ɵ-Marking. Linguistic Inquiry 19, 205–232.
 Hornstein, N., J. Nunes, and K. Grohmann 2005. Understanding Minimalism. New York: Cambridge University Press.
 Jespersen, O. 1965. A Modern English Grammar on Historical Principles, Part VI, Morphology. London: George Allen and Unwin Ltd.
 Osborne, T. and T. Groß 2012. Constructions are catenae: Construction Grammar meets Dependency Grammar. Cognitive Linguistics 23, 1, 163–214.
 
 
 
 Steven, S., A. Fazly, and R.North. 2004. Statistical measures of the semi-productivity of light verb constructions. In 2nd ACL workshop on multiword expressions: Integrating processing, pp. 1–8.

External links
 Miriam Butt's The light verb jungle
 Tan Yee Fan's site for light verb constructions 
 Ryan North's Computational Measures of the Acceptability of Light Verb Constructions
 Vincze, Veronika Detecting noun compounds and light verb constructions: a contrastive study

Verb types